Elvis Agyemang (born 24 October 1988) is a Ghanaian televangelist and author. He is the founder of Grace Mountain Ministry and best known for Alpha Hour , the most watched Facebook Live Stream in Ghana.

Early life and education 
Elvis was born in Tema but relocated to Kumasi with his family where he had his basic school education. He completed Adventist Senior High School before proceeding to pursue a BSc. Biological Science at the Kwame Nkrumah University of Science and Technology. He also has a MSc. Religious Studies from the Central University.

Career 
Elvis started his career as a biology teacher at Tema Technical Secondary School after completing his undergraduate education at the KNUST and later worked shortly with Acacia Health Insurance before his call to start a church.  

His devotion to God and ministry began at a young age because he was born into a Christian family. In primary school, he started organizing prayer sessions, which he continued through junior high school. He joined the Pentecost Students Association (PENSA) while a student at the university and often planned devotions for his fellow students in his hostel. 

After experiencing a spiritual visitation in 2015 while battling a disease that nearly claimed his life, Elvis started Grace Mountain Ministry with 32 members. The church currently has locations in Madina and Kumasi.

Alpha hour 
Elvis Agyemang launched the well-known online Alpha Hour, a one-hour non-denominational prayer meeting, on his social media pages. Every day at midnight, he gathers hundreds of people from all around the world to pray. His Facebook live broadcast has grown to be the most watched live stream in Ghana since its start with a peak viewership of 50,000 and it still draws a lot of people into prayer from all around the world. On Facebook, Elvis has more than 800K fans, and as of September 2022, his YouTube channel had 200,000 subscribers.

Personal life 
Elvis is married to Mercy Agyemang and they both live in Accra with their two children.

Publications 
Elvis is the author of five books which are available for purchase on his website; 

 The Believer's Dominion
 The Lamb and the Beast
 Accessing Your Blessings in the Great High Priest
 The Eternal Pathway
 The Mystery of Godliness Revealed.

References

External links 

 
 
 

Television evangelists
Ghanaian Christians
1988 births
People from Tema
Kwame Nkrumah University of Science and Technology alumni
Central University (Ghana) alumni
Living people